TBD (also referred to unofficially as TBD TV; branded on-air as TBD.) is an American digital multicast television network owned by the Sinclair Television Group subsidiary of the Sinclair Broadcast Group and operated by Jukin Media. Targeting millennial audiences, the network focuses on viral video and reality shows.

Background
The development of TBD is traced to a visit by Sinclair Broadcast Group management to the Santa Monica, California headquarters of the Tennis Channel in early 2016 (Sinclair purchased the cable network in January of that year). While touring Tennis Channel's main control room, company executives spotted a monitor carrying the foreign feed of The QYOU, a Dublin-based digital media company and online video service headed by co-founders Curt Marvis and Scott Ehrlich, which curates various online video content aggregated from various producers for European audiences. Seeing the QYOU feed sparked a conversation among the executives about developing a similar service for television viewers in the United States, which Sinclair proceeded to bring to concept.

History
The company formally announced the planned launch of TBD on December 7, 2016. TBD is the third of four digital broadcast networks that Sinclair has developed and launched during the 2010s: it previously launched the sports-focused American Sports Network in August 2014 (which rebranded to Stadium in 2017), and science fiction-focused network Comet in October 2015, and around the time of the TBD announcement, it also disclosed plans to launch action-adventure network Charge!, a joint venture with Comet partner MGM Television that debuted on February 28, 2017 (since January 2016, Sinclair has also operated a 24-hour feed of the Stadium network, which is otherwise structured as an ad hoc syndication service aired on an event-driven basis on either the primary channel or subchannel of carrier stations that maintain a conventional entertainment format). To assemble programming and help provide creative support for TBD, Sinclair has retained the services of The QYOU, marking the first venture into advertiser-supported broadcast television for the company, which already operates a pay television service in Europe; The QYOU has not ruled out developing a similar subscription television service in the U.S. or ad-supported networks modeled after TBD in other countries.

In its press release announcing TBD's launch, Sinclair expressed that the network would be "reinvigorating traditional television for today's millennial audience", a demographic cohort that tends to enjoy video content via online sources other than traditional broadcast or cable television, although some within the demographic do supplement online content with over-the-air television. The network's more contemporary programming (digital-first series and videos) and younger-skewing target audience makes TBD unique in comparison to many other digital multicast networks that feature classic television programs and movies aimed toward older audiences or niche audiences based on gender, ethnicity or genre interest. As part of that reach to millennials, TBD takes a "screen agnostic" approach to delivery, appearing not only on broadcast television, but through an online platform and eventually through apps for smartphones, tablets and smart TV devices (the network's website provides a live stream of its programming, exempting advertising and interstitial segments aired during breaks within and between programs).

The "TBD" name came in a sort of roundabout way for Sinclair: early in the network's conception, Scott Shapiro, Sinclair's vice president of corporate development, referred to it by the abbreviation for "to be determined". Realizing that Sinclair's 2014 acquisition of Allbritton Communications included ownership of the TBD.com domain name (which was used for Allbritton's former Washington, D.C.-area news site and also briefly for its associated regional cable news channel NewsChannel 8), the network was officially bestowed the TBD name and TBD.com domain as, according to Sinclair's press release announcing its launch, "TBD's entertainment promise is always 'To Be Determined'." TBD commenced broadcasting as a "soft roll-out" on February 13, 2017 on the subchannels of two Sinclair stations: Fox affiliate WLUK-TV in Green Bay, Wisconsin and CBS affiliate WTVH in Syracuse, New York (the latter of which is operated by Sinclair through a local marketing agreement with WTVH owner Granite Broadcasting).

On October 16, 2018, Sinclair signed an agreement with Jukin Media to assume operational responsibilities for TBD, effective immediately. The agreement will also result in content supplied by Jukin being expanded on TBD's programming lineup. Jukin Media would later go on to be acquired by Trusted Media Brands in 2021, a parent company of Reader's Digest.

Programming

TBD's schedule features various web-originated films, scripted and unscripted series, showcase programming, and featurettes – featuring a wide range of topical and themed categories including but not limited to science, fashion, lifestyle, travel, music, comedy, gaming, esports, and viral content – through deals with various online content producers and distributors which license their content for broadcast on TBD including: Canvas Media Studios, Jukin Media, Filmhub (formerly Kinonation), Legendary Entertainment (including content from subsidiaries Nerdist Industries and Geek and Sundry), Whistle Sports Network (which also provides short segments aired during certain commercial breaks) and Zoomin.TV.

From the network's launch, through its partnership with The QYOU, TBD carried daily "preview" blocks of the service's daypart-based video compilation programs, which regularly aired four times per day each weekday, including during the overnight and morning hours seven days a week and during the afternoon and early evening on weekdays (and initially, Saturdays until September 2017). (TBD did not carry sample blocks of The QYOU's weekend programming, opting instead to air rebroadcasts selected from the weekday QYOU blocks that the network aired over the prior week in the morning and late night on Saturdays and Sundays.) In September 2017, TBD began scaling back the daily QYOU blocks carried within its schedule, ceding certain weekday prime time and weekend mid-afternoon time slots to the network's other entertainment programs. As a result of an agreement reached between QYOU Media and Sinclair Digital Group to terminate their content agreement for TBD, the network ceased carrying all QYOU programming on September 17, 2018. (The time periods occupied by the QYOU sampler blocks were replaced with additional airings of existing short-form-content-focused compilation programs in TBD's inventory, with feature films replacing QYOU Primes former weekday early evening slot.)

Sinclair is also negotiating agreements with other web content producers, distributors and application developers to provide programming for the network. Another possible content avenue for TBD may come via resources from the news-producing stations among Sinclair's stable of 172 owned-or-operated television stations and their websites, which would bring the various local lifestyle and various features that they produce to a national audience through TBD, as well as through its digital news service Circa News.

The network currently holds exclusive responsibility for advertising sales, setting aside three to six minutes per hour of advertising inventory within its program breaks; advertising on TBD at present consists mainly of public service announcements and some direct response advertising (the remaining time is usually filled by Whistle Sports-produced interstitials), though the network encourages prospective national sponsors to develop experimental advertisements tailored to appeal toward the network's key demographic. Sinclair plans to review allowing TBD's affiliates to be able to lease time for inserting station promotions and commercials for local businesses in the future.

On May 7, 2018, TBD began carrying KidsClick, a multiplatform children's programming endeavor launched the previous year featuring long-form and short-form animated content from various production studios. The move resulted in TBD transitioning into being the block's national subchannel carrier, which had been asserted by Tribune Media-owned This TV since the three-hour morning cartoon block debuted in July 2017. (TBD became the exclusive network carrier of KidsClick on July 1, 2018, as a result of This TV discontinuing carriage of the block, one month before the collapse of the proposed merger between Tribune and Sinclair.) The block was discontinued less than ten months later on March 31, 2019.

Affiliates

, TBD has current and pending affiliation agreements with 55 television stations in 45 media markets (all of which are owned or operated by Sinclair) across 25 states and the District of Columbia. The network has a combined national reach of 22.44% of all households in the United States (or 70,129,858 Americans with at least one television set).

Along with WLUK and WTVH, Sinclair's "soft rollout" of TBD during the week of February 13, 2017, saw the network added to digital subchannels of three other stations owned by Sinclair directly: KDSM-TV/Des Moines, KABB/San Antonio and KUNP/La Grande-Portland, Oregon. The network is being rolled out in three phases to work out any technical and transmission issues; 52 stations owned or operated by Sinclair became TBD charter affiliates at the conclusion of the first phase of affiliate rollout in early March 2017 (most of which joined the network on February 28). Other stations among those which Sinclair owns or operates (including stations it operates through sharing agreements with third-party licensees, and partner groups Deerfield Media, Howard Stirk Holdings, and Cunningham Broadcasting) are expected to begin carrying TBD during the late winter and spring of 2017, either on newly created subchannels or existing ones that were affiliated with Grit, GetTV or other competing multicast networks through affiliation agreements with Sinclair that are pending expiration.

Sinclair's launch of TBD – as well as Comet and Charge! before and after it – is part of the company's aim toward "expanding our business with new digital multicast networks that leverage our broadcast spectrum and household reach", as expressed by the company's President and CEO, Christopher Ripley, in the press release announcing TBD's launch.  The "soft rollout" on Sinclair stations during the first half of 2017 is also intended to work out any technical and transmission issues. Once those issues are worked out and TBD begins to gain footing, Sinclair will begin offering the network to individual stations and station groups in markets where Sinclair does not have a broadcast presence.

Some of Sinclair's stations (as well as others not owned by Sinclair or its partner groups that are affiliated with the syndication service) may elect to use the TBD subchannel as an alternate outlet for the American Sports Network, pre-empting certain afternoon and/or evening programs within the national TBD schedule to carry sports events not carried by the main channel of its CW and MyNetworkTV affiliates or independent stations. Among its current affiliates, WRLH-TV in Richmond, Virginia – which carries the network on its DT2 subchannel – does not carry TBD's full programming schedule, airing the MyNetworkTV prime time lineup in place of TBD programs that air from 8:00 to 10:00 p.m. Eastern Time weeknights (such an arrangement, which dates to the subchannel's prior affiliation with This TV, is necessary because the Richmond market lacks enough available commercial stations for MyNetworkTV to maintain a standalone main channel affiliation).

As of January 2021, TBD is the primary affiliation on three stations (all controlled by Sinclair): WXBU in Lancaster, Pennsylvania (serving Harrisburg), KENV-DT in Elko, Nevada (a submarket of the Salt Lake City market), and WTTE in Columbus, Ohio. All three stations were at one point affiliated with major networks: WXBU (then as WLYH-TV) was affiliated with CBS (sharing that with WHP-TV until 1995; Sinclair later bought WHP-TV outright), then UPN & The CW (the latter now airing on WHP-TV 21.3), while KENV-DT shared the NBC affiliation with primary NBC affiliate KSL-TV and WTTE was affiliated with Fox before its intellectual property was moved to ABC affiliate WSYX (which Sinclair also owns outright) on channel 6.3.

References

External links
 

Television networks in the United States
English-language television stations in the United States
Television channels and stations established in 2017
2017 establishments in the United States
Sinclair Broadcast Group